The following radio stations broadcast on AM frequency 1665 kHz:

In Australia 
 2MM in Dulwich Hill, New South Wales.
 Vision Christian Radio in Melbourne (eastern), Victoria.

References

Lists of radio stations by frequency